Distant Thunder (or A Distant Thunder) may refer to:

Film & television
Distant Thunder (1973 film), (Ashani Sanket) a film by Indian director Satyajit Ray
Distant Thunder (1988 film), a drama film by Rick Rosenthal
Enrai, a 1981 Japanese film directed by Kichitaro Negishi
"Distant Thunder" (Upstairs, Downstairs), episode 12 of season 3 of the series, aired in 1971
"Distant Thunder", episode 5 of the anime Koi Kaze
A Distant Thunder (film), the second film in the A Thief in the Night film series

Music
Distant Thunder (marching band), a marching band that later became Nexus Drum & Bugle Corps
Distant Thunder (Aswad album), a 1988 album by Aswad
A Distant Thunder (album), a 1988 album by Helstar
Distant Thunder, a 1987 album by Checkfield